Callum Porter (born 22 February 1999) was an Australian rules footballer who played for the Western Bulldogs in the Australian Football League (AFL). He was recruited by the Western Bulldogs with the 74th draft pick in the 2017 AFL draft.

Early Football
Porter played for the Gippsland Power for 2 seasons in 2016 and 2017. He claimed the best and fairest medal at the Gippsland Power in 2017, and finished seventh in the best and fairest count for the TAC Cup that year. Prior to this he played junior football for the Officer Kangaroos in the South East Juniors.

AFL career
Porter debuted in the Bulldogs' close win against the Gold Coast Suns in the eighth round of the 2020 AFL season. Porter had 9 disposals and laid 4 tackles in his first game. However, Porter suffered a minor shoulder injury and was taken out of the team for the next round.

Statistics
Statistics are correct to the 2020 season

|- style="background-color: #eaeaea"
! scope="row" style="text-align:center" | 2018
|  || 28 || 0 || — || — || — || — || — || — || — || — || — || — || — || — || — || —
|-
! scope="row" style="text-align:center" | 2019
|  || 28 || 0 || — || — || — || — || — || — || — || — || — || — || — || — || — || —
|- style="background:#EAEAEA"
| scope="row" text-align:center | 2020
| 
| 28 || 1 || 0 || 0 || 4 || 5 || 9 || 0 || 4 || 0.0 || 0.0 || 4.0 || 5.0 || 9.0 || 0.0 || 4.0
|- style="background:#EAEAEA; font-weight:bold; width:2em"
| scope="row" text-align:center class="sortbottom" colspan=3 | Career
| 1
| 0
| 0
| 4
| 5
| 9
| 0
| 4
| 0.0
| 0.0
| 4.0
| 5.0
| 9.0
| 0.0
| 4.0
|}

References

External links

1999 births
Living people
Western Bulldogs players
Australian rules footballers from Melbourne
Gippsland Power players
Box Hill Football Club players
Casey Demons players